Hilleshög is a village (smaller locality) in Ekerö Municipality, Stockholm County, southeastern Sweden.

Hilleshög Church is located here.

Notable residents
 Ulrika von Strussenfelt (1801-1873), writer
 Amelie von Strussenfelt (1803-1847), writer

References

Populated places in Ekerö Municipality
Uppland